Linqu County is a county, originally known as "Pianyi", located in the southwest of Weifang and the middle of Shandong Peninsula, Shandong Province, China. Linqu also has the name Zhuxu County. Linqu has a population of 926 thousand(2020).

With a long history of over 2000 years since its establishment in the West Han Dynasty, Linqu is well known for its beautiful sceneries and rich cultures, such as traditional operas, brush paintings and calligraphy, rare rock arts, Mount Yi National Forest Park, Shanwang National Geography Park, Old Dragon Spring and Shimenfang Park. Its over 210 archeology sites include Dawenkou culture and Longshan culture relics. It was also the site of the Battle of Linqu in 409

Geography 
There are many mountains in the county, such as Mountain Yi and Mountain Song. The River Mi originated from the foothills of Mountain Yi. It is the first water system the main irrigation river in the county. The Yeyuan Reservoir in the upper reaches of the River Mi is the largest water storage area in the county, with the reservoir capacity ranking among the top ten.

Climate

Administrative divisions 
After the township merger in 2007, Linqu has jurisdiction over 2 subdistricts, 8 towns, and a high-tech industrial park.
Subdistricts
Chengguan Subdistrict
Dongcheng Subdistrict
Yeyuan Subdistrict
Xinzhai Subdistrict
Towns

Economy 
The current economy is dominated by aluminum alloy and stainless steel building materials.

Linqu Qinchi Winery once bought CCTV prime-time advertisements at a high price of 320 million yuan, making it a re-election for the second term.

Linqu's GDP

Sightseeing

Notes

External links 
Official website of Linqu County Government

 
Counties of Shandong
Weifang